Senator Galbraith

Peter Galbraith (born 1950), Vermont State Senate
Thomas J. Galbraith (1825–1909), Minnesota State Senate

See also
Asher A. Galbreath (1864–1935), Ohio State Senate